Shivi (alias Sibi, Shibi, Sivi) is mentioned as a kingdom and as the name of a king in the ancient Indian epic Mahabharata. There was a king named Shivi who became famous as Shivi or the kingdom itself may be named after him. Shivi (alias Sibi, Saivya) king was famous for his truthfulness. The legend about his truthfulness and compassion goes as follows: King Shivi protected a dove who was chased by a hawk (which wanted to eat the dove as its midday meal), and gave flesh from his thigh, as a substitute meal to the hawk.

It is also mentioned in the epic that Jayadratha was the king of Sindhu, Sauvira and Shivi kingdoms. Probably Sauvira and Shivi were two kingdom close to the Sindhu kingdom and Jayadratha conquered them, which would place Shivi somewhere in western Rajasthan though alternatively it could also be Sibi, Balochistan which is to the west of Sauvira and Sindhu and adjacent to both. Jayadratha was an ally of Duryodhana and husband of Duryodhana's sister Dussala.

It is also mentioned that Yudhishthira, king of Hastinapur after the great Kurukshetra War, married a beautiful girl Devika of the Sivi tribe, and she later begot a son to him, Yaudheya, from whom the Yaudheyas claim their descent.

Geographical locations
According to Sivi Játaka, king Sivi (as Bodhisatta) had ruled Sivirattha with his capital at Aritthapura (Aristapura of Sanskrit) and is said to have donated his eyes to a blind Brahmana Chinese traveler  Faxian  records the scene of this story at So-ho-to (Swat), a country to the south of Oddiyana between the Kabol and the Indus rivers.

In some versions, Sivi appears as a personal name but in others it is the name of the country and its people. According to 7th-century Chinese monk and traveller Xuanzang, Sivika (Sibika) had cut his body to pieces to save a dove from a hawk. Xuanzang described Sivika as a personal name or an epithet. Chinese envoy Song Yun (518-20 AD) also refers to Sivika raja (Sivi king) and connects him to Oddiyana. Thus, the Chinese evidence  connects king Sivi/Sivika and the Sivi people or  country with the Oddiyana/Swat territory between the   Kabol and Indus rivers, which forms part of modern Khyber Pakhtunkhwa province of Pakistan. Aritthapura of the Buddhist Sivi Jataka is same as the Orobatis of Alexander's historians. B. C. Law connects Jataka's Aritthapura with Ptolemy's Aristobothro in the north of Punjab.

It has been identified with Shahbazgarhi region, north of river Kabol. Dr S. B. Chaudhury also states that Aritthapura of the Sivi Jataka points to Swat valley as the ancient country of the Sivis. Matsya Purana says that Indus flowed through the Janapada of Sivapura (country of the Sivis). There is also another Buddhist legend known as Vessantara Jataka which states that king Vessantara was the son of Sañjaya (king of Sivirattha or Sivi-Rashtra) and was born in the capital city of Jatuttara. King Vessantara as a Bodhisatta had given away his magical elephant (which could bring rain on the asking) to a hostile country, and also his kingdom as well as his family with two children to a greedy Brahmana, all as acts of benevolence and generosity. Envoy Sung Yun makes reference to king Vessantara of Vessantara Jataka (as Pi-lo) while pilgrim Xuanzang refers to him (as Sudana) and both place the scene of history in the Oddiyana/Swat, north of Kabol river. But the Jatuttara of Vessantara Jataka is taken to be same as Jattaraur of Al-Biruni and is often identified with Nagri or Tambavati Nagri, 11 miles north of Chittore in Rajputana. In this connection, N. L. Dey has  observed that there were two countries called Sivi---one located in Swat (Oddiyana) with its capital at Aritthapura and the second is the same as the Sivika of Varahamihira  which he places among the countries of the south-west with its capital at Jatuttara in Madhyamika (south-west Rajputana). It has also been suggested that Sivi was originally a geographical name from which the name of its ruler and that of its people may have been derived.

In the Mahabharata, the name Sivi is connected with Asura and like Kamboja, it is also linked to the mythological goddess Diti. The Brahmanical texts also mentions that king Sivi was son of king Usinara and was from Anava (Anu) lineage. While referring to a certain Sakya legend connected with 'Oddiyana locale' (Khyber Pakhtunkhwa province of Pakistan), James Fergusson connects the Oddiyana country with the Kamboja of the Hindu texts. Indeed, the territories of Kunar, Oddiyana, Swat and Varanaos   had been the notable habitats of the Asvaka Kambojas since remote antiquity. The Asvakas were  cattle breeders and horse folk  and had earned the epithet of Asvakas due to their intimate connections with the Asvas ("horses"). The Sivis, as described by Alexander's historians, "were a shaved-headed people, worshipers of god Shiva, wore clothes made from animal skins, and were warlike people who fought with the clubs...most of these are also the salient characteristics of the ancient Kambojas".

Mahabharata refers to the Kambojas as Munda ("shaved-headed soldiery"). In the same Mahabharata text, Rudra Siva is also given the epithet of Munda. The Kambojas are also attested to have been ardent worshipers of Siva-cult (Munda-cult).

In fact, the Mahabharata evidence shows that the promulgator of synthetic Siva cult was one sage Upamanyu, son of Vyaghrapada. Upamanyu was a disciple of Ayodha Dhaumya who taught at Taxila University in Gandhara. The northern Kamboja affinities of this Upamanyu (the epic promulgator of Synthetic Siva cult) are indicated and have been accepted  since his son/or descendant Aupamanyava is specifically referred to as Kamboja in the Vamsa Brahmana of the Samaveda. Since "Munda" is an epithet of god Rudra-Siva, it has also been suggested that the Sivis derive their name from god Siva whom they ardently worshiped.

It appears likely that the Sivis originally lived in north of river Kabol in remote antiquity, from where sections of them moved southwards in later times and settled in what is called Seva around Bolan Pass, which region was known as Sivistan till recently. Pāṇini also mentions a place called Sivapura which he includes in the Udichya (northern) division of Ancient India  and which is identified by some scholars with Sibipura of the Shorkot Inscriptions edited by Vogel. The southerly movement of the Sivis is also evidenced from their other settlement called Usinara near Yamuna, ruled by Sivi king called Usinara. Sivis also are attested to have one settlement in Sind, another one in Madhyamika (Tambavati Nagri) near Chittore (in Rajputana) and yet another one on the Dasa Kumara-chrita on the banks of the Kaveri in southern India (Karnataka/Tamil Nadu). It is mentioned in the epic that Jayadratha was the king of Sindhu, Sauvira and Sivi kingdoms. Sauvira and Sivi were two kingdom close to the Sindhu kingdom and Jayadratha conquered them, which would place Sivi somewhere in Balochistan which is to the west of Sauvira and Sindhu and adjacent to both. Some writers think that Sivi may have been originally located at the foot of Bolan Pass from there they might have extended their influence to Oddiyana/Swat but this is unlikely.

Taking clue from Yaska's Nirukta, S. Levi states that "the Kambhojas were a branch of the Bhojas and were not a part of the Aryans (i.e Indo Aryans)". The name "Kambhojas"  is etymologised as  Kamblala + Bhojas ("the Bhojas with Kambalas or blankets") as well as Kamniya + Bhojas (meaning "The handsome Bhojas or the desirable Bhojas"). Thus,    Levi and others have connected the ancient Bhojas with the Kambhojas. Both Kambojas and the Bhojas are also referred to as north-western people in the 13th Rock Edict of king Asoka. Thus, the Kambojas  appear to have either been anciently and inadvertently confused with the Bhojas who were a Yadava tribe, or, else, there was indeed some kind of link between the Bhojas and the ancient Kambhojas as S. Levi suggests. Writers like James F. K. Hewitt and others also connect the Sivis, Bhojas and the Drhuyus with the Kambhojas. The Chinese evidence on king Sivi as well as king Vessantara (Sudana, Saniraja or Pi-lo of the Chinese records), the rulers of Oddiyana (in pre-Buddhist times) also seems to lend a fair credence in this direction.

See also 
 Kingdoms of Ancient India

Notes

References 
 Mahabharata of Krishna Dwaipayana Vyasa, translated to English by Kisari Mohan Ganguli

External links

Kingdoms in the Mahabharata